Hütteldorf  is a station on  of the Vienna U-Bahn. The U-Bahn station is housed within a train shed at the Wien Hütteldorf railway station, which is also served by long distance and regional trains, and by Vienna S-Bahn lines S45, S50 and S60.

Both stations are located in the Penzing District. The U-Bahn station opened in 1981.

References

Buildings and structures in Penzing (Vienna)
Railway stations opened in 1981
1981 establishments in Austria
Vienna U-Bahn stations
Railway stations in Austria opened in the 20th century

de:U-Bahn-Station Hütteldorf